Copablepharon is a genus of moths of the family Noctuidae.

Species
 Copablepharon absidum (Harvey, 1875)
 Copablepharon alaskensis Crabo & Lafontaine, 2004
 Copablepharon albisericeum Blanchard, 1976
 Copablepharon atrinotum Crabo & Lafontaine, 2004
 Copablepharon canarianum McDunnough, 1932 (syn: Copablepharon contrastum McDunnough, 1932)
 Copablepharon canarianum canarianum McDunnough, 1932
 Copablepharon canarianum contrasa McDunnough, 1932
 Copablepharon columbia Crabo & Lafontaine, 2004
 Copablepharon flavum Fauske & Lafontaine, 2004
 Copablepharon fuscum Troubridge & Crabo, 1996
 Copablepharon gillaspyi Blanchard, 1976
 Copablepharon grandis (Strecker, 1878)
 Copablepharon longipenne Grote, 1882
 Copablepharon michiganensis Crabo & Lafontaine, 2004
 Copablepharon michiganensis serraticornis (Blanchard, 1976)
 Copablepharon mustelini Crabo & Lafontaine, 2004
 Copablepharon mutans Crabo & Lafontaine, 2004
 Copablepharon nevada Crabo & Lafontaine, 2004
 Copablepharon opleri Lafontaine, 2004
 Copablepharon pictum Fauske & Lafontaine, 2004
 Copablepharon robertsoni Crabo & Lafontaine, 2004
 Copablepharon sanctaemonicae Dyar, 1904
 Copablepharon serratigrande Lafontaine, 2004
 Copablepharon serratum McDunnough, 1932
 Copablepharon spiritum Crabo & Fauske, 2004
 Copablepharon spiritum bicolor Crabo & Fauske, 2004
 Copablepharon spiritum lutescens Crabo & Fauske, 2004
 Copablepharon viridisparsa Dod, 1916
 Copablepharon viridisparsa hopfingeri (Franclemont, 1954)
 Copablepharon viridisparsa gilvum Crabo & Lafontaine, 2004
 Copablepharon viridisparsa ravum Crabo & Lafontaine, 2004
 Copablepharon viridisparsa viridisparsa Dod, 1916

Former species
 Copablepharon album is now Protogygia album (Harvey, 1876)

References
 Copablepharon at Markku Savela's Lepidoptera and Some Other Life Forms
 Natural History Museum Lepidoptera genus database

Noctuinae